Roger Cassidy Clinton Jr. (born July 25, 1956) is an American actor and musician. He is primarily known for being the younger half-brother of former United States President Bill Clinton.

Early life and education
Roger Cassidy Clinton is the only child of car salesman Roger Clinton Sr. and nurse Virginia Dell Cassidy. As a child, Bill Clinton (then Bill Blythe) often had to protect young Roger from his father, an abusive alcoholic. He became a musician and formed a rock band named "Dealer's Choice."

Career

Acting
Clinton has had minor roles in several films, including Bio-Dome and Fred Claus, and guest-starred on a number of television shows, including The Nanny as himself (neighbor), Sabrina, the Teenage Witch, and Cybill. He also provided the voice of his half-brother, President Bill Clinton, in the pilot episode of The Blues Brothers: The Animated Series.

Music
Clinton developed his singing career under the direction of Arkansas music impresario and manager Butch Stone. He gained professional experience by singing warm-ups for the studio audiences at tapings of the sitcom Designing Women, as well as by working as a lounge singer. As a result of a deal struck by Stone and music-industry attorney Stann Findelle, Clinton was initially contracted to Atlantic Records in 1992. His first album, Nothing Good Comes Easy, was released in September 1993 on the Pyramid/Atlantic/Rhino label. In December 1999, Clinton and his band paid a visit to Pyongyang, performing alongside North and South Korean musical acts. He has played Farm Aid, and sang "Feelin' Alright" in Cleveland during "The Cleveland Funeral", a program produced as a part of The Howard Stern Show.

Personal life 
From a brief relationship with Martha Spivey, he has a daughter named Macy (b. 1992). Clinton married Molly D'Ann Martin on March 26, 1994. Their son, Tyler Cassidy Clinton, was born on May 12, 1994.

Presidency of Bill Clinton
During his brother's presidential campaign and subsequent administration, Clinton was given the codename "Headache" by the Secret Service due to his controversial behavior. Clinton attracted negative media attention in 2001 when it was revealed that he had accepted $50,000 and a Rolex watch in 1999 from the children of Sicilian mobster Rosario Gambino, a convicted narcotics trafficker and Gambino crime family member serving a 49-year sentence, in exchange for lobbying his brother to pardon Gambino. Clinton repeatedly visited the federal parole commission headquarters to advocate for Gambino. In 1999, Gambino was included in a list of potential pardons, but he was ultimately not granted one. In January 2001, before his brother left office, Clinton was granted a controversial presidential pardon for a 1985 cocaine possession and drug-trafficking conviction. Roger Clinton Jr. had served time in federal prison after being convicted following a sting operation of conspiracy to distribute cocaine.

Driving-under-the-influence arrests
Roger Clinton pleaded guilty in August 2001 to a misdemeanor count of reckless driving after Hermosa Beach, California, city prosecutors agreed to drop two driving-under-the-influence (DUI) charges and one count of disturbing the peace against him. He was sentenced then to two years' probation, ordered not to drive with any alcohol or drugs in his system and to pay about $1,350 in fines and costs.

Since it had been more than ten years since his first DUI, according to California state law, this arrest was also treated as a first-time DUI. Clinton pleaded no contest to the charge of driving while impaired. The charge of driving with a blood alcohol content of 0.08% or higher was dismissed. As part of his plea agreement, he was sentenced to three years' probation for the DUI, and two days in jail for refusing a chemical test. He was ordered to pay a $390 fine (which increased to nearly $2,000 when penalty assessments, court fees, and other fines were added) and was also ordered to attend a nine-month alcohol program—the most a first-time offender can get—because his blood alcohol content measured 0.230% and 0.237% in a preliminary alcohol screening. In addition, because his arrest occurred in Los Angeles County, under the terms of Assembly Bill 91, the California Department of Motor Vehicles also required that he install an ignition interlock device in all vehicles he owned for a minimum of 5 months.

Filmography

Film

Television

Video games

See also

 List of people pardoned or granted clemency by the president of the United States

References

External links

1956 births
American male film actors
American rock guitarists
American male guitarists
Family of Bill and Hillary Clinton
Living people
Male actors from Arkansas
Guitarists from Arkansas
Actors from Hot Springs, Arkansas
Recipients of American presidential pardons
20th-century American guitarists
Musicians from Hot Springs, Arkansas
20th-century American male musicians